The Dictionary of Legal Quotations is a dictionary of quotations compiled by James William Norton-Kyshe and published in 1904.

When this book was first published it was "quite a novelty among legal publications".
The "value and interest" of the learning contained in this collection is "for the scholar rather than for the active practitioner".

Notes

References
Norton-Kyshe. The Dictionary of Legal Quotations. 1904. Digitized copies from Internet Archive:   .
Marke, Julius J (editor). A Catalogue of the Law Collection at New York University. The Law Centre of New York University. New York: 1953. Reprinted by the Lawbook Exchange Limited. 1999. Page 1213 from Google Books.
"Reviews and Notices" (1905) 21 Law Quarterly Review 95 Internet Archive.

External links

Law books
Books of quotations
English-language books